Konstanty Iwanowicz Ostrogski (c. 1460 – 10 August 1530; ;) was a Ruthenian prince and magnate of the Grand Duchy of Lithuania and later a Grand Hetman of Lithuania from 11 September 1497 until his death.

Ostrogski began his military career under John I Albert, King of Poland. He took part in successful campaigns against the Tatars and Grand Duchy of Moscow. For his victory near Ochakiv against Mehmed I Giray's forces he was awarded with the title of Grand Hetman of Lithuania. He was the first person to receive this title. However, during a war with Muscovy he was defeated in the Battle of Vedrosha (1500) and held captive for three years. In 1503, he managed to escape and joined king Sigismund I the Old, who allowed him to resume his post as a Hetman. As one of the main military leaders (alongside Polish generals Mikołaj Firlej and Mikołaj Kamieniecki) of the alliance he continued to wage war against the Grand Duchy of Moscow and in 1512 achieved a great victory against the Tatars in the Battle of Wisniowiec.

In 1514 another war with the Grand Duchy of Moscow started and Ostrogski became the commander in chief of all the Polish and Lithuanian forces (amounting to up to 35,000 soldiers). Among his subordinates were Jerzy Radziwiłł, Witold Sampoliński and the future Hetman of the Crown Jan Tarnowski. On 8 September 1514 he achieved a significant victory in the Battle of Orsha, defeating the army of Vasili III of Russia. However, in 1517 his attempt to besiege the Russian fortress of Opochka became a serious defeat that destroyed any hopes to reconquer Smolensk.

He had two wives: Tatiana Koretska and Aleksandra Słucka. He had two sons: Illia Ostrogski with Koretska, and Konstanty Wasyl Ostrogski with Słucka.

He died in 1530 as a well-respected military commander. Despite his steady loyalty to Catholic Poland as well as an old feud with an Orthodox Muscovy, Ostrogski himself remained a devout Orthodox in traditions of his family. He gave generously for construction of Eastern Orthodox churches and sponsored the creation of many church-affiliated schools for the Orthodox children. As one of the wealthiest Orthodox nobles he was buried in the Kyiv Pechersk Lavra in Kyiv.

He is one of the characters on the famous painting by Polish painter Jan Matejko, Prussian Homage.

The town of Starokostiantyniv still bears his name. The Lithuanian–Polish–Ukrainian Brigade is also named after him. For his wars against Crimea see Crimean-Nogai Raids, years 1508–1527, including Battle of Olshanitsa.

Commemoration 
In the cities of Ukraine, there are a number of streets named after the prince

See also
Lithuanian nobility
Ostrogski family
List of szlachta

External links

 Ostrozky, Kostiantyn
 Ostrozki family

Great Hetmans of the Grand Duchy of Lithuania
People from Ostroh
Konstanty Ostrogski
City founders
Burials at the Cathedral of the Dormition, Kyiv Pechersk Lavra
Eastern Orthodox Christians from Lithuania
1460s births
1530 deaths
Year of birth uncertain